Lapta may refer to:

 Lapta (game), a Russian sport
 Lapta Türk Birliği S.K., a sports club in Lapithos, Cyprus
 Lapithos, a village in Cyprus